Yunesi District is a district (bakhsh) in Bajestan County, Razavi Khorasan Province, Iran. At the 2006 census, its population was 9,683, in 2,531 families.  The district has one city: Yunesi.  The district has two rural districts (dehestan): Sar Daq Rural District and Yunesi Rural District.

References 

Districts of Razavi Khorasan Province
Bajestan County